Luis Camargo Pacheco (1582 – 29 March 1665) was a Roman Catholic prelate who served as Auxiliary Bishop of Seville (1622–1665).

Biography
Luis Camargo Pacheco was born in Seville, Spain in 1582. On 11 July 1622, he was selected by the King of Spain and confirmed by Pope Gregory XV as Auxiliary Bishop of Seville and Titular Bishop of Centuria. In 1622, he was consecrated bishop by Diego Guzmán de Haros, Patriarch of the West Indies. He served as Auxiliary Bishop of Seville until his death on 29 March 1665.

Episcopal succession
While bishop, he was the principal co-consecrator of 
Fernando Andrade Sotomayor, Bishop of Palencia (1628); 
Luis Córdoba Ronquillo, Bishop of Cartagena (1631); 
Mendo de Benavides, Bishop of Segovia (1634); and 
Juan Queipo de Llano y Valdés (bishop), Bishop of Guadix (1640).

See also
Catholic Church in Spain

References

External links and additional sources
 (for Chronology of Bishops) 
 (for Chronology of Bishops) 

1582 births
1665 deaths
17th-century Roman Catholic bishops in Spain
Bishops appointed by Pope Gregory XV